Patrick Taylor is a retired medical researcher, professor emeritus at the University of British Columbia, and best-selling novelist.

Born in 1941 and brought up in Bangor, Northern Ireland, Taylor studied and practiced medicine in Belfast and rural Ulster before immigrating to Canada in 1970 to work in the field of human infertility. From 1987 to 1989 he worked at the Bourn Hall Fertility Clinic in association with 2010 Nobel laureate Sir Robert Edwards. Taylor has received three lifetime achievement awards including the Lifetime Award of Excellence in Reproductive Medicine of the Canadian Fertility and Andrology Society.

He has written or contributed to 170 academic papers and six textbooks and also served as editor-in-chief of the Canadian Obstetrics and Gynaecology Journal, as well as writing several medical humour columns and serving as book reviewer for Stitches: The Journal of Medical Humour.

Taylor has published more than fifteen works of creative writing, all set in Northern Ireland. He is best known for his Irish Country series, several of which have been international bestsellers, particularly in Canada, where Taylor has resided since 1970.

An earlier work, written with TF Baskett, titled The Complete Anthology of En Passant 1989-1999, is a collection of their shared humour columns.

Taylor now lives on Salt Spring Island, BC, Canada.

Books

Fiction

The Irish Country series

Stories of the Irish Troubles 

 Only Wounded: Ulster Stories
 Now and in the Hour of Our Death
 Pray for Us Sinners

Nonfiction 

 The Complete Anthology of En Passant 1989-1999 (with T.F. Baskett)

References

External links
 About the Irish Country books series at Tor Books

1941 births
Northern Ireland emigrants to Canada
Canadian obstetricians
Canadian male novelists
Living people
Academic staff of the University of British Columbia
Canadian male short story writers
21st-century Canadian novelists
Writers from British Columbia
21st-century Canadian short story writers
21st-century Canadian male writers